Mutant Pop Records was an independent record label founded in Corvallis, Oregon in 1995. After ceasing the release of new material in 2002, the label made a brief comeback attempt in 2008 before terminating operations at the end of that year.

Company history

A label for collectors
Mutant Pop Records was a single person operation, a so-called "shoestore label"(called as such because it was literally run out of the basement of a shoe store), begun in April 1995. Signing all his releases T. Chandler, Timbo Davenport  'set out to create a collectible series, featuring a uniform design, drawing inspiration from labels of the 70s,' while issuing limited runs of colored vinyl. The label had an estimated 100 releases including vinyl EPs, full-length CDs, and several waves of a short-run CD-R mail-order series.

Artists

 After School Special
 The Automatics
 Boris the Sprinkler
 The Connie Dungs
 Darlington
 Dillinger Four
 Dirt Bike Annie
 Egghead
 The Frantics
 High School Hellcats
 Jon Cougar Concentration Camp
 The Kung Fu Monkeys
 The Mansfields (Kill Your Radio)
 The Peabodys
 Ruth's Hat
 Sicko
 The Wallys

Footnotes

External links
 Mutant Pop Records official web site. Retrieved February 19, 2010.
 Interview with T. Chandler, The Punkhouse, December 1998. Retrieved February 19, 2010.

American independent record labels
Punk record labels
Record labels established in 1995
Record labels disestablished in 2008
Oregon record labels
Privately held companies based in Oregon
Companies based in Corvallis, Oregon
1995 establishments in Oregon